The Europe/Africa Zone was one of three zones of regional competition in the 2018 Fed Cup.

Group I 
 Venue: Tallink Tennis Centre, Tallinn, Estonia (indoor hard)
 Date: 7–10 February

The fourteen teams were divided into two pools of three teams and two pools of four teams. The four pool winners took part in promotion play-offs to determine the two nations advancing to the World Group II play-offs. The nations finishing last in their pools took part in relegation play-offs, with the two losing nations being relegated to Group II for 2019.

Seeding

 1Fed Cup Rankings as of 13 November 2017

Pools

Play-offs

Final placements 

Group II 
 Venue: Tatoi Club, Athens, Greece (clay)
 Date: 18–21 April

The seven teams were divided into two pools of three and four teams. The four nations finishing first and second took part in a play-off to determine the nations advancing to Group I in 2019. The two nations finishing last (Pool A) and second last (Pool B) in their pools took part in a relegation play-off. The nation finishing last in Pool B was automatically relegated alongside the losing nation of the play-off to Group II for 2019. Moldova withdrew before the event.

Seeding

 1Fed Cup Rankings as of 12 February 2018

Pools

Play-offs 

Group III 
 Venue 1: Cité Nationale Sportive, Tunis, Tunisia (hard) 
 Venue 2: Ulcinj Bellevue, Ulcinj, Montenegro (clay)
 Date: 16–21 April

The seventeen teams were divided into three pools of four teams and one pool of five teams. The four nations finishing first and second took part in a play-off to determine the nations advancing to Group I in 2019. One nation will be promoted from each venue.

Seeding

 1Fed Cup Rankings as of 12 February 2018

Pools

Play-offs 

References 

 Fed Cup Result, 2018 Europe/Africa Group I
 Fed Cup Result, 2018 Europe/Africa Group II
 Fed Cup Result, 2018 Europe/Africa Group III

External links 
 Fed Cup website

 
Europe Africa
Tennis tournaments in Estonia
Tennis tournaments in Greece
Tennis tournaments in Montenegro
Tennis tournaments in Tunisia
2018 in Greek tennis